Emin Levonovich Khachaturian (5 August 1930 – 5 August 2000) was an Armenian conductor and composer, who was active mainly in Moscow through the 1960s and 1970s and in Yerevan in later years. For the former he was named a People's Artist of the Russian SFSR in 1975.

Life
Khachaturian was born 5 August 1930 in Yerevan, Armenia, the son of singer Lewon Khachaturian and brother of Aram Khachaturian. He died 5 August 2000.

Career
After graduating from the Moscow Conservatory under Alexander Gauk he started his conducting career with Moscow Region Symphony in 1957. In 1960 he was appointed lead conductor of the Orchestra of the Bolshoi Theatre, and he moved the following year to the Cinematographical State Symphony, which he led until 1979. From 1986 until his death in 2000, he led the Armenian Radio Symphony and the Yerevan Chamber Orchestra. He was also active in Yerevan as a professor in the national conservatory.

Personal
He created and led the Aram Khachaturian Association with his niece Leily until his death.

Premieres

References

Armenian conductors (music)
1930 births
2000 deaths
Musicians from Yerevan
People's Artists of Russia
Soviet Armenians